Bloomville Methodist Episcopal Church is a historic Methodist Episcopal church and parsonage of New York state.

It is located at 35 Church Street in Bloomville, a hamlet of Kortright in Delaware County. The church is a large rectangular wood-frame buildings constructed in stages between about 1810 and 1889. It is surmounted by a steep gable roof and a three-stage tower. The parsonage is a -story wood-frame building with a hipped roof built in 1904.

It was added to the National Register of Historic Places in 2006.

References

Methodist churches in New York (state)
Churches on the National Register of Historic Places in New York (state)
Churches completed in 1889
19th-century Methodist church buildings in the United States
National Register of Historic Places in Delaware County, New York
Churches in Delaware County, New York